The 2020  Women's PSA World Series Finals was the second women's edition of the PSA World Tour Finals (Prize money : $185,000) after the renaming of PSA World Series. The top 8 players in the 2019–20 PSA World Tour are qualified for the event. The event took place at Mall of Arabia, Cairo in Egypt from 28 September–3 October 2020.

It was the second edition under the PSA World Tour Finals label after the PSA renamed PSA World Series to current PSA World Tour Finals. CIB remains as the title sponsor.

Defending champion Raneem El Weleily could not defend last year title as she announced its retirement on 25 June 2020. Hania El Hammamy won its first PSA Finals in his first Finals appearance after defeating compatriot Nour El Tayeb 3–2 in the Final. El Hammamy went 2–0 down, but managed to turn it around to win 3–2.

PSA World Ranking Points
PSA also awards points towards World Ranking. Points are awarded as follows:

Match points distribution
Points towards the standings are awarded when the following scores:

Qualification & Seeds

Qualification
Top eight players at 2019–20 PSA World Tour standings qualifies to Finals.

Seeds

Group stage results
Times are Eastern European Time (UTC+02:00). To the best of three games.

Group A

Standings

Group B

Standings

Knockout stage

Semifinal
To the best of three games.

Final
To the best of five games.

See also
2020 Men's PSA World Tour Finals
2019–20 PSA World Tour
2020–21 PSA World Tour
2019–20 PSA World Tour Finals
PSA World Tour Finals

References

External links
PSA World Tour Finals at PSA website
PSA World Tour Finals official website

W
PSA World Tour Finals
PSA World Tour Finals
PSA World Tour Finals